Stephen or Steve Griffiths may refer to:

Stephen Shaun Griffiths (born 1969), convicted of the Bradford murders in 2010
Steve Griffiths (footballer) (1914–1998), English footballer
Steve Griffiths (athlete) (born 1964), Jamaican sprinter
Steve Griffiths (rugby union) (born 1973), English-born Scotland rugby union player
Steven Griffiths (born 1962), Australian politician
Steven Griffiths (cricketer) (born 1973), English cricketer